The Meade River (Iñupiaq: Kuulugruaq) flows into Admiralty Bay along the North Slope of the U.S. state of Alaska. It begins near Kulugra Ridge in the National Petroleum Reserve–Alaska and flows generally north past Atqasuk to the bay at the southern end of Dease Inlet on the Beaufort Sea.

See also
List of rivers of Alaska

References

Rivers of North Slope Borough, Alaska
Rivers of Alaska